This is a list of properties on the National Register of Historic Places in the U.S. state of Michigan.



Current listings by county

Alcona County

|}

Alger County

Allegan County

Alpena County

|}

Antrim County

|}

Arenac County

|}

Baraga County

|}

Barry County

|}

Bay County

Benzie County

|}

Listings Formerly Located in Benzie County
The following listing was located in Benzie County at the time it was placed on the Register, but has since moved to Manistee County.

Berrien County

Branch County

Calhoun County

Cass County

Charlevoix County

Cheboygan County

Chippewa County

Clare County

|}

Clinton County

|}

Crawford County

|}

Delta County

Dickinson County

|}

Eaton County

Emmet County

Genesee County

Gladwin County
There are no sites listed on the National Register of Historic Places in Gladwin County.

Gogebic County

Grand Traverse County

Gratiot County

Hillsdale County

|}

Houghton County

Huron County

Ingham County

Ionia County

Iosco County

|}

Iron County

Isabella County

|}

Jackson County

Kalamazoo County

Kalkaska County
There are no sites listed on the National Register of Historic Places in Kalkaska County.

Kent County

Keweenaw County

Lake County

|}

Lapeer County

Leelanau County

Lenawee County

Livingston County

Luce County

|}

Mackinac County

Macomb County

Manistee County

Marquette County

Mason County

|}

Mecosta County

|}

Menominee County

Midland County

Missaukee County

|}

Monroe County

Montcalm County

|}

Montmorency County
There are no sites listed on the National Register of Historic Places in Montmorency County.

Muskegon County

Newaygo County

|}

Oakland County

Oceana County

|}

Ogemaw County
There are no sites listed on the National Register of Historic Places in Ogemaw County.

Ontonagon County

|}

Osceola County
There are no sites listed on the National Register of Historic Places in Osceola County.

Oscoda County

|}

Otsego County

|}

Ottawa County

Presque Isle County

Roscommon County

|}

Saginaw County

Sanilac County

Schoolcraft County

|}

Shiawassee County

St. Clair County

St. Joseph County

Tuscola County

Van Buren County

|}

Washtenaw County

Wayne County

Wexford County

|}

See also
 List of National Historic Landmarks in Michigan
 List of Michigan State Historic Markers
 List of Michigan State Historic Sites

References

Michigan